Epichorista phaeocoma is a species of moth of the family Tortricidae. It is found in Malawi.

References

Endemic fauna of Malawi
Moths described in 1914
Epichorista